Cyperus armstrongii is a species of sedge that is native to parts of Queensland in north eastern Australia.

It was first formally described by the botanist George Bentham in 1878.

See also 
 List of Cyperus species

References 

armstrongii
Plants described in 1878
Flora of Queensland
Taxa named by George Bentham